Struggle for Eagle Peak is a 1960 Norwegian crime film directed by Tancred Ibsen. It was entered into the 10th Berlin International Film Festival.

Cast
 Alf Malland as Tomas Gran
 Tor Stokke as Harry Smidt
 Eva Bergh as Edna Gran
 Ingerid Vardund as Vera Ruud, journalist
 Einar Sissener as Redaktøren
 Ola Isene as Overlegen
 Wilfred Breistrand as the senior resident attending physician

References

External links

1960 films
1960s Norwegian-language films
1960 crime films
Norwegian black-and-white films
Films directed by Tancred Ibsen
Norwegian crime films